The Karamanlides (Karamanlídes), also known as Karamanli Greeks or simply Karamanlis, are a traditionally Turkish-speaking Greek Orthodox people native to the region of Karaman in Anatolia.

The origin of the Karamanlides is disputed; they are either descendants of Byzantine Greeks who were linguistically Turkified, or of Christian Turkic soldiers who settled in the region after the Turkic conquests. The Karamanlides were forced to leave Anatolia during the 1923 population exchange between Greece and Turkey. Today, a majority of the population live in Greece and have been well integrated into Greek society.

Language 

Writers and speakers of Karamanli Turkish were expelled from Turkey as part of the Greek-Turkish population exchange of 1923. Some speakers preserved their language in the diaspora.

A fragment of a manuscript written in Karamanli was also found in the Cairo Geniza.

Origins 
The origin of the Karamanlides is disputed; they are either descendants of Byzantine Greeks who were linguistically Turkified, or of Christian Turkic soldiers who settled in the region after the Turkic conquests. Greek scholars incline to the view that the Karamanlides were of Greek descent and adopted Turkish as their vernacular, either by force or as a result of their isolation from the Greek-speaking Orthodox Christians of the coastal regions. Turkish scholars regard them as the descendants of Turks who had migrated to Byzantine territories before the conquest or had served as mercenaries in the Byzantine armies and who had adopted the religion but not the language of their new rulers. There is not enough evidence to prove how the Karamanlides identified themselves.

Partial or full Turkification of Anatolian Greeks dates back to the early 1100s, as a result of living together with neighboring Turks. Oriental and Latin sources indicate that Greek-Turkish bilingualism was common in Anatolia in the 13th and 14th centuries, and by the early 15th century it was very widespread. Furthermore, an anonymous Latin account from 1437 states that Greek bishops and metropolitans in Anatolia, were "dressed in the Muslim style and spoke Turkic"; "although the liturgy was still read in Greek the sermons were pronounced in Turkic." Karamanlides could be descendants of those Turkified Greeks.

The Ottoman explorer Evliya Çelebi, who visited the Karamanlides and experienced their lifestyle, wrote that they were of Turkish origin and their Turkish accent was no different than that of the local Muslim Turks. They printed books, particularly the bible, in Turkish language and chanted hymns in Karamanlidika, despite their neighborhoods also having Greek-speaking communities. The British historian Arnold J. Toynbee (1889-1975) also considered the Karamanlides to be of Turkish descent; however, he emphasized that there was no definite answer to the question of their origins.

The German traveler Hans Dernschwam (1494-1568/69) encountered the Karamanlides living in Istanbul during his travel throughout Anatolia in 1553-1555; he described them as "a Christian folk of the Greek faith whom Selim I had transplanted from the emirate of Karamania." The Armenian historian Eremya Çelebi Kömürciyan (1637-1695), also stated that Karamanlides lived around and within the city walls of Istanbul, and despite being Greek, they did not know Greek and spoke only Turkish. A Karamanlis author named Mauromates (1656-1740) wrote that the Greek language was replaced by Turkish in Anatolia, and were thus unable to read the "masterpieces of Greek literature." Another Karamanlis author named Iosepos Moesiodax, wrote in his Paedagogy (1779) that "the need of our public demands good Turkish, because it is the dialect of our Rulers." The English writer William Martin Leake (1777-1860), who travelled in Konya in 1800, wrote:

The German orientalist Franz Taeschner (1888-1967) observed that the Karamanlides were completely Turkified, with the exception of their religion. The British historian Edwin Pears (1835-1919), who lived in Turkey for approximately 40 years, wrote that the Karamanlides were originally Greeks, who had lost their native language and spoke Turkish. Robert Pinkerton (1780-1859) stated that the Turkish oppression had made them adopt the Turkish language:

Similarly, the British scholar David George Hogarth (1862-1927) attributed the Turkification of the Karamanlides to oppression; in 1890 while visiting Lake Eğirdir, he wrote that "the Moslems were eating them up."

Population exchange between Greece and Turkey 
Many Karamanlides were forced to leave their homes during the 1923 population exchange between Greece and Turkey. Early estimates placed the number of Turkish-speaking Orthodox Christians expelled from central and southern Anatolia at around 100,000. Stevan K. Pavlowitch says that the Karamanlides were numbered at around 400,000 at the time of the exchange.

The Turkish government considered cutting a deal for Turkish-speaking Christians to be exempt from the population exchange. At the end however, it was decided that religion would be the only criterion of the exchange. Greek political elites saw no harm in taking in more Greek Orthodox Christians, but Turkish political elites remained fearful that the Karamanlides' loyalty to the Greek Orthodox Patriarchate would eventually undercut efforts to consolidate state control in the poor and underdeveloped region of Karaman. Only Papa Eftim (born ), who was an ardent Turkish nationalist and the creator of the Turkish Orthodox Church was allowed to remain in Anatolia. Upon their arrival in Greece, Karamanlides faced many instances of discrimination by the local Greek population "because they spoke the language of the age-old enemy of Hellenism"; sometimes even taunted with the allegation that they were of Turkish background. In the 1980s, they were well integrated into Greek society.

Culture 
The distinct culture that developed among the Karamanlides blended elements of Orthodox Christianity with a Turkish-Anatolian culture that characterized their willingness to accept and immerse themselves in foreign customs. From the 14th to the 19th centuries, they enjoyed an explosion in literary refinement. Karamanlides authors were especially productive in philosophy, religious writings, novels, and historical texts. Their lyrical poetry in the late 19th century describes their indifference to both Greek and Turkish governments, and the confusion which they felt as a Turkish-speaking people with a Greek Orthodox religion.

Footnotes

References 

Cappadocian Greeks
Ethnic groups in Greece
Ethnic groups in Turkey
Anatolia
History of Cappadocia
Members of the Church of Greece
Greek people